Alibabayum 41 Kallanmaarum is a 1975 Indian Malayalam-language film,  directed by J. Sasikumar and produced by M. J. Kurien. The film stars Prem Nazir, Jayabharathi, Bahadoor, KP Ummer, Vidhubala, Adoor Bhasi and Thikkurissy Sukumaran Nair. The film has musical score by G. Devarajan.

Cast

Prem Nazir as Alibaba
Jayabharathi as Marjiyana
Vidhubala as Fatima/Laila, daughter of a merchant
K. P. Ummer as Sherkhan Abu Hassan, chief of the thieves
Bahadoor
Adoor Bhasi
Thikkurissy Sukumaran Nair as Father of Fatima/Laila
Sreelatha Namboothiri
T. R. Omana as Naseema Begam, mother of Alibaba and Qasim
T. S. Muthaiah as Shah Alam Parvaz, father of Marjiyana
Jyothi Lakshmi
Meena
Vijayalalitha

Soundtrack

References

External links
 

1975 films
1970s Malayalam-language films
Indian fantasy films
Films directed by J. Sasikumar
1970s fantasy films